Robert Williams (14 April 1913 – 30 June 2004) was an Australian rules footballer who played with Hawthorn in the Victorian Football League (VFL).

Used mostly on the wing or half forward flanks, Williams spent 13 years at Hawthorn, after coming to the club from Canterbury. His job as a milk carter meant he didn't feature at all in the 1933 VFL season, as his employers didn't want him playing football. He was, however, a regular fixture in the side from 1935, until his retirement in 1944.

Williams was Hawthorn's second leading goal-kicker in 1940, with 23 goals, just two behind Albert Naismith. He finished second in the goal-kicking again in the 1943 season, which he had spent as captain. Only a one-point loss in the final round of the home and away season prevented him from having the distinction of captaining the first ever Hawthorn team to compete in finals football.

Honours and achievements
Individual
 Hawthorn captain: 1943
 Hawthorn life member

References

1913 births
2004 deaths
Australian rules footballers from Victoria (Australia)
Hawthorn Football Club players